Progress Alberta is a Canadian not for profit left-leaning advocacy organisation founded and operated by Duncan Kinney.

Organization 

Progress Alberta is based in Edmonton, Alberta and run by executive director Duncan Kinney. It is a political left of centre leaning advocacy organisation that was launched in 2016.

History 
Progress Alberta threatened legal action in 2020, when it claimed it was the target of Alberta Premier Jason Kenney and his United Conservative Party who launched a public inquiry into the funding of environmental advocacy in Alberta. The inquiry focussed on how United States-based philanthropic foundations partly funded environmental activism work in Alberta. Prior to the inquiry, Progress Alberta had received tens of thousands of dollars from Tides Foundation in 2016 and 2017. Duncan Kinney and lawyer Amir Attaran both argued that the inquiry was a breach of the Canadian Charter of Rights and Freedoms.

The organisation's executive director was accused of vandalising Edmonton's Roman Shukhevych statue in 2022.

Activities 
The organisation produces the progressive news publication The Progress Report.

References

External links 

 Progress Alberta Official website

2016 establishments in Alberta
Organizations based in Edmonton
Organizations established in 2016
Left-wing politics in Canada